Mohammad Hashemi Rafsanjani (born 29 August 1942) is an Iranian politician who was a member of the Expediency Discernment Council from 1997 to 2012. He served as vice president in charge of executive affairs during the presidency of his older brother, Akbar Hashemi Rafsanjani, and later under the first cabinet of President Mohammad Khatami. He was also the head of Islamic Republic of Iran Broadcasting for 12 and half years, and was replaced by Ali Larijani in the post. Mohammad Hashemi is an alumnus of UC Berkeley. After the death of his brother in 2017, Mohammad Hashemi Rafsanjani, he launched a presidential campaign,  but it was not approved by the Guardian Council.

References

External links
Iran: Youth Leader Discusses Recent Local Elections

1942 births
Living people
Members of the Expediency Discernment Council
Akbar Hashemi Rafsanjani
Executives of Construction Party politicians
Central Council of the Islamic Republican Party members
Vice Presidents of Iran for Executive Affairs

People from Kerman Province